Richard Colley is a former professional rugby league footballer who played in the 2000s, He played for the Batley Bulldogs in the National League One, as a  or . He previously played for the Bradford Bulls in the Super League, Stanley Rangers ARLFC and Barrow Raiders.

References

External links
 (archived by web.archive.org) Batley Bulldogs profile
Rugby League Project stats
 (archived by web.archive.org) SL stats

Living people
Barrow Raiders players
Batley Bulldogs players
Bradford Bulls players
English rugby league players
Rugby articles needing expert attention
1984 births